Raghunathpur is a Village Development Committee in Dhanusa District in the Janakpur Zone of south-eastern Nepal. At the time of the 1991 Nepal census it had a population of 9,762 persons residing in 1962 individual households.

References

External links 
UN map of the municipalities of Dhanusa District

Populated places in Dhanusha District

Raj kumar yadav, first person in Nepal doing PhD in social work is from Raghunathpur.